Carlo Checchinato (born 30 August 1970 in Adria, Province of Rovigo) is an Italian rugby union former player and is the current team manager for the Italy national team.

Checchinato was born in Adria, close to Rovigo. His father, called Giancarlo, was an international lock, being capped for Italy during the 1970s. He was with the Italy national team at the World Cup in 1995 in South Africa, 1999 in Wales and in 2003 in Australia as well as in several tournaments. He earned 83 caps and scored 21 tries in international matches. Checchinato's international try total was an all-time record for forwards until 2007, when it was surpassed by Colin Charvis of Wales.

Normally a number eight, he played for Rugby Rovigo and Benetton Treviso.

Currently he is the Italy national Team manager.

References

External links
RBS 6 Nations profile
 bio
 ERC bio

1970 births
Living people
People from Adria
Italian rugby union players
Rugby union number eights
Benetton Rugby players
Italy international rugby union players
Sportspeople from the Province of Rovigo